Naskh may refer to:

 Naskh (script), a type of script for the Arabic language
 Naskh (tafsir), an exegetical theory in Islamic law